Khondaker Mostaq Ahmad (also spelled Khandakar Mushtaq Ahmed;  – 5 March 1996) was a Bangladeshi politician. He was the President of Bangladesh from 15 August to 6 November 1975, after the assassination of Sheikh Mujibur Rahman. He was part of the conspiracy that brought about the assassination of Sheikh Mujibur Rahman on 15 August 1975. He took on the role of president immediately after the assassination, praised the assassins as "sons of the sun" and put cabinet ministers loyal to Sheikh Mujibur Rahman in jail.

Background
Khondaker Mostaq Ahmad was born between 1918 and 1919, into a Bengali Muslim family of Khondakars in the village of Dashpara in Daudkandi, Comilla (formerly District of Tippera). He completed his Bachelor of Laws degree at the University of Dhaka and entered politics in 1942. He was one of the founder joint secretaries of the East Pakistan Awami Muslim League.

Political career
Ahmad was elected a member of the East Pakistan Provincial Assembly in 1954 as a candidate of the United Front. After the central government of Pakistan dissolved the United Front, Ahmad was jailed in 1954 along with other Bengali leaders. He was released in 1955 and elected the chief whip of the United Front parliamentary party.

In 1958, with the promulgation of martial law, he was arrested by the regime of Ayub Khan.

During the 6 Point Movement, Ahmad was again jailed in 1966. Following his release, Ahmad accompanied Sheikh Mujibur Rahman (then the most senior leader of the Awami League) to the all-parties conference called by Ayub Khan in Rawalpindi in 1969.

In 1970 he was elected a member of the National Assembly of Pakistan.

Government of Bangladesh in exile
At the onset of the Bangladesh War of Independence and Mujib's arrest, Ahmad and other Awami League leaders gathered in Meherpur to form the Government of Bangladesh in exile. Syed Nazrul Islam served as the acting president while Mujib was declared president, Tajuddin Ahmad was appointed prime minister and Khondakar Mostaq Ahmed was made the foreign minister. In this capacity, Ahmad was to build international support for the cause of Bangladesh's independence. But his role as the Foreign Minister became controversial as he wanted a peaceful solution, remaining within Pakistan in line with the Six Point Charter of his leader Sheikh Mujib. Zafrullah Chowdhury alleges that Ahmad did not act alone in this regard and that Awami League leaders were involved.

After the liberation, Ahmad was appointed the Minister of Power, Irrigation and Flood Control in 1972 as part of the Second Sheikh Mujib cabinet. In 1973, he took charge of the Ministry of Commerce in the Third Sheikh Mujib cabinet. He was a member of the executive committee of Bangladesh Krishak Sramik Awami League (BAKSAL) which was formed in 1975.

Presidency
Sheikh Mujib and all members of his family, except his daughters, who were in West Germany at the time, were assassinated by a group of army personnel on 15 August.

Ahmad immediately took control of the government, proclaiming himself President. All three services chiefs were dismissed and replaced by next in line seniors. Major General Ziaur Rahman was appointed Chief of Army Staff of the Bangladesh Army, replacing K M Shafiullah. Air Vice Marshal A. K. Khandekar was replaced by AVM M G Ghulam Tawab. Mushhtaq reportedly praised the plotters who killed Sheikh Mujibur Rahman calling them Shurjo Shontan (sons of the sun). Mushtaq Ahmad also ordered the imprisonment of leaders Syed Nazrul Islam, Tajuddin Ahmad, A. H. M. Qamaruzzaman and Muhammad Mansur Ali. He replaced the national slogan of Joy Bangla with Bangladesh Zindabad slogan and changed the name Bangladesh Betar to 'Radio Bangladesh'. He proclaimed the Indemnity Ordinance, which granted immunity from prosecution to the assassins of Mujib. Mujib's daughters Sheikh Hasina Wazed and Sheikh Rehana were barred from returning to Bangladesh from abroad. BAKSAL and pro-Mujib political groups were dissolved.

On 3 November, in what became infamously known as the "Jail Killing Day", the four imprisoned leaders Tajuddin Ahmad, Syed Nazrul Islam, A. H. M. Qamaruzzaman, and Muhammad Mansur Ali, who had refused to co-operate with Mostaq, were killed inside Dhaka Central Jail by a group of army officers on the instruction of President Khondaker Mostaq Ahmad. However, Mushtaq Ahmad was ousted from power on 6 November following a coup on 3 November led by Brigadier Khaled Mosharraf and Colonel Shafat Jamil among others.

Later life and legacy
Ahmad was imprisoned by Brigadier General Khaled Mosharraf and later by the Ziaur Rahman administration until 1978. Upon his release, he formed Democratic League and attempted to resuscitate his political career, but to no avail. He spent his last years in Dhaka and died on 5 March 1996.

Ahmad was named in the investigation of the murder of Sheikh Mujib launched in 1996 by his daughter Sheikh Hasina, who had just won the national elections to become Prime Minister of Bangladesh. Hasina blamed Ahmad for her father's death. Due to his death, he was not charged or tried. Historians and critics assert that Ahmad was one of the key plotters of Mujib's murder. He has been criticized by Bangladeshi liberal public for legitimizing political murders by protecting Mujib's killers.

See also
 BM Abbas

References

1910s births
1996 deaths
People from Comilla District
University of Dhaka alumni
Awami League politicians
Bangladeshi Muslims
Presidents of Bangladesh
Assassination of Sheikh Mujibur Rahman
Foreign ministers of Bangladesh
Commerce ministers of Bangladesh
1st Jatiya Sangsad members
Heads of government who were later imprisoned
Bangladesh Krishak Sramik Awami League executive committee members
Bangladesh Krishak Sramik Awami League central committee members